This list of University of Madras people includes notable graduates, professors, and administrators affiliated with the University of Madras. Five heads of state and two Nobel laureates have been associated with the university.

Arts 

K. A. Nilakanta Sastri, Historian and author, Padma Bhushan (1957)
Sarvepalli Gopal, Indian historian, Padma Vibhushan (1999)
Ranvir Shah, Founder of Prakriti Foundation
Gemini Ganesan, Tamil film actor, Padma Shri (1971)
Mani Ratnam, Film director, screenwriter and producer, Padma Shri (2002)
Sashi Kumar, Journalist and film director, Founder, Asianet
 Chitra Ramanathan, Contemporary fine artist, Painting
M.G. Ramachandran, Film actor and former Chief Minister of Tamil Nadu, Bharat Ratna (1988)
Mahesh Babu, Telugu film actor, Filmfare Awards South (3), Nandi Awards (7)
K. C. S. Paniker, Abstract painter, Lalit Kala Akademi Ratna (1976)

Business and Economics

Jay Vijayan, Chief Information Officer (CIO) at Tesla Motors
Kakkadan Nandanath Raj, one of the architects of the Five-Year Plans of India, Padma Vibhushan (2000)
Raja Chelliah, Founding chairman of the Madras School of Economics, Padma Vibhushan (2007)
C. K. Prahalad, Prominent business thinker, Padma Bhushan (2009)
Prathap C. Reddy, Founder, Apollo Hospitals, Padma Vibhushan (2010)
Ram Shriram, Founding board member of Google Inc.
Verghese Kurien, Father of White Revolution in India, Padma Vibhushan (1999)
Indra Nooyi, chairman, PepsiCo, Padma Bhushan (2007)
Srikanth Balachandran, Global CFO, Bharti Airtel
Suresh Krishna, TVS Group, Padma Shri (2006)
Kalanithi Maran, Founder and chairman of Sun Group
Kasinathuni Nageswara Rao, Founder of Amrutanjan Healthcare and Andhra Patrika
Usha Ananthasubramanian, chairman and managing director of the Bhartiya Mahila Bank
Mahesh Amalean, Engineer and industrialist, Deshamanya (2005)
Pushkala Prasad, Zankel Chair Professor of Management and Liberal Arts at Skidmore College

Civil Servants and Diplomats

Humanities and Social Sciences

Literature

Military
Every Gentlemen Cadet from Officers Training Academy (OTA) Chennai gets a masters degree from University of Madras

Politics and Law

Heads of State

Supreme Court Judges

Others

Educationists 

M. Aram, Educator and peace advocate, Padma Shri (1990)
G. Viswanathan, Founder and chancellor, VIT University
V. M. Muralidharan, Chairman, Ethiraj College for Women

Religion

Science, Technology, Engineering, and Mathematics

Nobel Laureates

Abel Prize Winners

Turing Awardee

Others 

Pakkiriswamy Chandra Sekharan, Forensic expert and Padma Bhushan winner
John Barnabas, Evolutionary biologist, Shanti Swarup Bhatnagar Prize (1974)
Avadhesha Surolia, Glycobiologist, Shanti Swarup Bhatnagar Prize (1987)
Thavamani Jegajothivel Pandian, Geneticist, Shanti Swarup Bhatnagar Prize (1984)
Narayanaswamy Srinivasan, Molecular biophysicist, Shanti Swarup Bhatnagar Prize (2007)
T. R. Govindachari, Natural product chemist, Shanti Swarup Bhatnagar Prize (1960)
P. T. Narasimhan, theoretical chemist, Shanti Swarup Bhatnagar (1970)
Paramasivam Natarajan, photochemist, Shanti Swarup Bhatnagar (1984)
Siva Umapathy, organometallic chemist, Shanti Swarup Bhatnagar laureate.
Subramania Ranganathan, organic chemist, Shanti Swarup Bhatnagar laureate
Govindasamy Mugesh, physical chemist, Shanti Swarup Bhatnagar laureate
Kunchithapadam Gopalan, geochronologist, Shanti Swarup Bhatnagar laureate
Rengaswamy Ramesh, geophysicist, Shanti Swarup Bhatnagar laureate
Mangalore Anantha Pai, electrical engineer, Shanti Swarup Bhatnagar laureate
Nuggehalli Raghuveer Moudgal, endocrinologist, Shanti Swarup Bhatnagar laureate
E. S. Raja Gopal, physicist, Shanti Swarup Bhatnagar laureate
Muthusamy Lakshmanan, theoretical physicist, Shanti Swarup Bhatnagar laureate
E. V. Sampathkumaran, condensed matter physicist, Shanti Swarup Bhatnagar laureate
K. Sekar, bioinformatician, N-Bios laureate
Kumaravel Somasundaram, cancer biologist, N-Bios laureate
G. Dhinakar Raj, veterinary scientist, N-Bios laureate
S. Ganesh, molecular geneticist, N-Bios laureate
P. Karthe, structural biologist, N-Bios laureate
C. S. Seshadri (FRS), Shanti Swarup Bhatnagar Prize (1972)
M. S. Narasimhan (FRS), Shanti Swarup Bhatnagar Prize (1975)
K. S. Chandrasekharan, Srinivasa Ramanujan Medal (1966), Shanti Swarup Bhatnagar Prize (1963)
M. S. Raghunathan (FRS), Srinivasa Ramanujan Medal (1991), Shanti Swarup Bhatnagar Prize (1977)
Sundararaman Ramanan, Srinivasa Ramanujan Medal (2010), Shanti Swarup Bhatnagar Prize (1979)
C. P. Ramanujam, Ramanujam–Samuel theorem and Ramanujam vanishing theorem
Krishnaswami Alladi, Fellow of American Mathematical Society
A.V. Balakrishnan, Control Heritage Award (2001)
Rangaswamy Srinivasan, pioneer work on Excimer laser at IBM Research, National Medal of Technology (2011)
M. S. Swaminathan, Father of Green Revolution in India, Padma Vibhushan (1989)

Sports

Others

 Siva Shankar Baba
 A. P. Balachandran
 A.V. Balakrishnan
 Bapu
 Chinmayananda Saraswati
 Chunkath Joseph Varkey
 Aswath Damodaran
 Ryder Devapriam
 Sudi Devanesen
 P. C. Devassia
 Methil Devika
 Michael Fernandes
 Anthony Leocadia Fletcher
 C.K. Gandhirajan
 Ramanathan Gnanadesikan
 Vijayalakshmy K. Gupta
 Randor Guy
 Lakshmi Holmström
 M. Yousuff Hussaini
 I. C. Chacko
 Cherakarottu Korula Jacob
 Alangar Jayagovind
 L. S. Kandasamy
 C. Kesavan
 Sundeep Kishan
 Kuppuswamy Kalyanasundaram
 A. D. Loganathan
 A. Sreedhara Menon
 Ram Mohan
 A. C. Muthiah
 Sameer Nair
 Joseph C. Panjikaran
 P. J. Thomas, Parakunnel
 Joseph Parecattil
 W. Lawrence S. Prabhakar
 PeeVee
 A. Sivathanu Pillai
 N. U. Prabhu
 Samantha Ruth Prabhu
 A. Sreekar Prasad
 Neelu
 R. Radhakrishnan
 Bellary Raghava
 R. K. Raghavan
 P. V. Rajaraman
 N. Ram
 K. R. Ramanathan
 K. P. Ratnam
 Palagummi Sainath
 B. A. Saletore
 Uma Sambanthan
 Ratnasothy Saravanamuttu
 C. S. Seshadri
 Shiva Rajkumar
 M. J. Rabi Singh
 Molly Easo Smith
 C. G. Somiah
 Raman Sukumar
 M. A. Sumanthiran
 Lily Thomas
 Typist Gopu
 Carlos G. Vallés
 Alarmel Valli
 T. G. Venkatraman
 Ravindra Wijegunaratne
 Virendranath Chattopadhyaya
 Pradeep John

Notes

References

University of Madras alumni
Madras